In mathematics, the Arens square is a topological space, named for Richard Friederich Arens. Its role is mainly to serve as a counterexample.

Definition

The Arens square is the topological space  where

The topology  is defined from the following basis.

Properties

The space  is:
Assuming that , then there exists an open interval  such that . Similar contradiction arises when assuming .
 semiregular, since the basis of neighbourhood that defined the topology consists of regular open sets.
 second countable, since  is countable and each point has a countable local basis. On the other hand  is neither weakly countably compact, nor locally compact.
 totally disconnected but not totally separated, since each of its connected components, and its quasi-components are all single points, except for the set  which is a two-point quasi-component.
 not scattered (every nonempty subset  of  contains a point isolated in ), since each basis set is dense-in-itself.
 not zero-dimensional, since  doesn't have a local basis consisting of open and closed sets. This is because for  small enough, the points  would be limit points but not interior points of each basis set.

References
Lynn Arthur Steen and J. Arthur Seebach, Jr., Counterexamples in Topology. Springer-Verlag, New York, 1978. Reprinted by Dover Publications, New York, 1995.  (Dover edition).

Topological spaces